Open Food Facts is a free, online and crowdsourced database of food products from around the world licensed under the Open Database License (ODBL) while its artwork—uploaded by contributors—is distributed under a Creative Commons Attribution–Share Alike license.

The project was launched on 19 May 2012 by French programmer Stéphane Gigandet during the Food Revolution Day organized by Jamie Oliver and has won the 2013 Dataconnexions Award from Etalab and the 2015 OKFN Award from Open Knowledge.

In May 2016, its database contained more than 80,000 products from 141 countries. In June 2017, thanks to the growing ecosystem of apps and open data imports from various countries, this number rose to 880,000. In October 2019 OFF passed the 1,000,000 products milestone.

Overview 

The project gathers information and data on food products from around the world.

For each item, the database stores its generic name, quantity, type of packaging, brand, category, manufacturing or processing locations, countries and stores where the product is sold, list of ingredients, any traces (for allergies, dietary laws or any specific diet), food additives and nutritional information. The nutritional value is calculated using the Nutri-Score.

Each contributor can add or edit food items based on the information explicitly shown on the package. As a result, the GTIN (Global Trade Item Number) embedded in the barcode on the packaging of the product (when available) is generally used as the identifier. Mobile phone applications allow for capturing photos and information that are reprocessed manually by volunteers.

Due to similar mechanisms for modification, extension, or deletion of content and structure, the project is sometimes compared to Wikipedia in the media.

Reuses 
The data is reused by various projects on issues related to palm oil, sugar, and location of the producers.

The Open Food Facts app 
Open Food Facts made an app for IOS and Android. With this app, it's possible for the contributors to quickly add products on the site (by photographing them and complete some product information). You can use the app to scan the barcode of food products and directly see the nutri-score and the eco-score. It's also easy to compare different food products based on their ingredients.

Open Food Fact days 
The Open Food Facts days is an annual event where contributors can brainstorm. There are also a lot of workshops.

See also 

 Information activism
 Right to know
 Farm-to-table

References

External links 
 
 Open Food Facts team wiki (English)
 http://blog.openfoodfacts.org/en/ (English)

Online databases
Consumer rights organizations
Food- and drink-related organizations
Creative Commons-licensed websites
Open content projects
Free-content websites
Crowdsourcing
Internet properties established in 2012